Michael Francis Thibault (born September 28, 1950) is an American basketball head coach, formerly of the Connecticut Sun of the WNBA, and now of the Washington Mystics. In 2013, Thibault became the WNBA's all time most successful coach with 212 victories.

Career
Upon his graduation from Saint Martin's University in 1979, Thibault entered into the employ of the Los Angeles Lakers of the National Basketball Association, for whom he worked first as a scout and, after 1980, as director of scouting and as an assistant coach; during Thibault's tenure, the Lakers twice won the league championship.

Thibault left the Lakers for the Chicago Bulls in 1982 and remained with the latter organization through the 1985-86 season, serving as an assistant coach and director of scouting; under Thibault, the team drafted shooting guard Michael Jordan and power forward Charles Oakley and acquired John Paxson, each of whom would contribute to the Bulls' earning six league championships between 1991 and 1999.

Thibault left the NBA for the World Basketball League in 1988 and served for two seasons as the head coach and franchise general manager for the Calgary 88's, winning the league's coach of the year award in 1988.

In 1989, Thibault began an eight-year stint as general manager and head coach of the Omaha Racers of the Continental Basketball Association, in which capacity he led the team to the league playoffs in each season; his team claimed the 1993 championship and once more reached the league finals one year thence.

Contemporaneously, Thibault worked for USA Basketball as a coach for the United States national team, leading the national side to a gold medal at the 1993 FIBA World Championship qualifying tournament and a silver medal at the 1995 Pan American Games.

Thibault returned to the NBA during the league's 1997-98 season and, through 2003, served as a scout and assistant coach for each of the Atlanta Hawks, New York Knicks, and Seattle SuperSonics; most prominently, Thibault spent four seasons with the Milwaukee Bucks as an advisor and assistant to George Karl.

Thibault was hired by the Sun in March 2003 to replace Dee Brown; Thibault garnered the WNBA Coach of the Year Award subsequent to the 2006 season, when he led the Sun to the Eastern Conference finals.   Thibault would again win the award in 2008 with the Sun.

On December 18, 2012, Thibault was introduced as the new head coach & general manager of the Washington Mystics. He led a revival of the team, getting them to the playoffs and earning a win there for the first time since 2004. For his efforts, Thibault once again earned the Coach of the Year award, joining Van Chancellor as the only coaches to win the award three times.

On July 7, 2018, when the Mystics beat the Los Angeles Sparks, Thibault became the first WNBA coach to reach 300 wins.

USA Basketball

Thibault served as an assistant coach for the USA National team in 2006, a team in transition. Lisa Leslie, who had led the team in scoring in the 2004 Olympics, the 2002 World Championships, the 2000 Olympics, the 1998 World Championships, and the 1996 Olympics was no longer on the team. Sheryl Swoopes was available but hampered by injuries, with Staley transitioning from player to coach. Newcomers Sue Bird, Candace Parker and Diana Taurasi picked up the slack, but it was a team in transition. As an additional challenge, some members of the squad were unable to join the team for practices due to WNBA commitments. The team started out strong, winning each of the six preliminary games, including the game against Russia. In the quarterfinals, the USA team beat Spain 90–56. The semifinal was a rematch against Russia, but this time the Russian team prevailed, 75–68. The USA faced Brazil in the bronze medal game, and won easily 99–59.

Personal
Mike and his wife Nanci have two children. A son, Eric, who is a member of the Mystics coaching staff and a daughter, Carly, who was named Head Coach at Fairfield University for the Stags on April 11, 2022.

Coaching Record

|-
| align="left" | CON
| align="left" |2003
|34||18||16||.529|| align="center" |3rd in East||4||2||2||.500
| align="center" |Lost in Conference Finals
|-
| align="left" |CON
| align="left" |2004
|34||18||16||.529|| align="center" |1st in East||8||5||3||.625
| align="center" |Lost in WNBA Finals
|-
| align="left" |CON
| align="left" |2005
| 34|| 26|| 8||.765|| align="center" |1st in East ||8||5||3||.625
| align="center" |Lost in WNBA Finals
|-
| align="left" |CON
| align="left" |2006
| 34|| 26|| 8||.765|| align="center" |1st in East ||5||3||2||.600
| align="center" |Lost in Conference Finals
|-
| align="left" |CON
| align="left" |2007
| 34|| 18|| 16||.529|| align="center" |3rd in East || 3|| 1|| 2||.333
| align="center" |Lost in Conference Semifinals
|-
| align="left" |CON
| align="left" |2008
| 34|| 21|| 13||.618|| align="center" |2nd in East ||3 ||1 ||2 ||.333
| align="center" |Lost in Conference Semifinals
|-
| align="left" |CON
| align="left" |2009
| 34|| 16|| 18||.471|| align="center" |6th in East ||— ||— ||— ||—
| align="center" |Missed Playoffs
|-
| align="left" |CON
| align="left" |2010
| 34|| 17|| 17|| .500 || align="center" |5th in East || —||— || —||—
| align="center" |Missed Playoffs
|-
| align="left" |CON
| align="left" |2011
| 34|| 21|| 13||.618|| align="center" |2nd in East || 2||0 ||2 ||.000
| align="center" |Lost in Conference Semifinals
|-
| align="left" |CON
| align="left" |2012
| 34|| 25|| 9||.735|| align="center" |1st in East ||5 ||3 ||2 ||
| align="center" |Lost in Conference Finals
|-
| align="left" |WAS
| align="left" |2013
| 34|| 17|| 17|| .500 || align="center" |3rd in East ||3 ||1 ||2 ||
| align="center" |Lost in Conference Semifinals
|-
| align="left" |WAS
| align="left" |2014
| 34|| 16|| 18||.471|| align="center" |3rd in East ||2 ||0 ||2 ||.000
| align="center" |Lost in Conference Semifinals
|-
| align="left" |WAS
| align="left" |2015
| 34|| 18|| 16|||| align="center" |4th in East ||3 ||1 ||2 ||
| align="center" |Lost in Conference Semifinals
|-
| align="left" |WAS
| align="left" |2016
| 34|| 13|| 21|||| align="center" |6th in East ||- ||- ||- ||-
| align="center" |Missed Playoffs
|-
| align="left" |WAS
| align="left" |2017
| 34|| 18|| 16|||| align="center" |3rd in East || 5 || 2 || 3 ||
| align="center" |Lost in Semifinals
|-
| align="left" |WAS
| align="left" |2018
| 34 || 22 || 12 || || align="center" | 2nd in East || 9 || 4 || 5 || 
| align="center" | Lost in WNBA Finals
|-! style="background:#FDE910;"
| align="left" |WAS
| align="left" |2019
| 34 || 26 || 8 || || align="center" | 1st in East || 9 || 6 || 3 || 
| align="center" | Won WNBA Championship
|-! 
| align="left" |WAS
| align="left" |2020
| 22 || 9 || 13 || || align="center" | 3rd in East || 1 || 0 || 1 || 
| align="center" | Lost in First Round
|-! 
| align="left" |WAS
| align="left" |2021
| 32 || 12 || 20 || || align="center" | 4th in East ||- ||- ||- || 
| align="center" | Missed Playoffs
|-! 
| align="left" |WAS
| align="left" |2022
| 36 || 22 || 14 || || align="center" | 3rd in East || 0 || 0 || 2 || 
| align="center" |Lost in First Round
|-class="sortbottom"
| align="left" |Career
| || 688 || 379 || 289 |||| || 72 || 34 || 38 || ||

References

External links
WNBA.com profile
WNBA.com chat transcript

1950 births
Living people
American expatriate basketball people in Canada
American women's basketball coaches
Basketball coaches from Minnesota
Chicago Bulls assistant coaches
Connecticut Sun coaches
Continental Basketball Association coaches
Los Angeles Lakers assistant coaches
Milwaukee Bucks assistant coaches
Washington Mystics head coaches
Washington Mystics coaches
United States men's national basketball team coaches
Women's National Basketball Association championship-winning head coaches
Women's National Basketball Association general managers
Saint Martin's University alumni